

Acts of the Northern Ireland Assembly

|-
| {{|Budget Act (Northern Ireland) 2012|ania|2|20-03-2012|maintained=y|archived=n|An Act to authorise the issue out of the Consolidated Fund of certain sums for the service of the years ending 31st March 2012 and 2013; to appropriate those sums for specified purposes; to authorise the Department of Finance and Personnel to borrow on the credit of the appropriated sums; to authorise the use for the public service of certain resources for the years ending 31st March 2012 and 2013; and to revise the limits on the use of certain accruing resources in the year ending 31st March 2012.}}
|-
| {{|Pensions Act (Northern Ireland) 2012|ania|3|01-06-2012|maintained=y|archived=n|An Act to make provision relating to pensions; and for connected purposes.}}
|-
| {{|Budget (No. 2) Act (Northern Ireland) 2012|ania|4|20-07-2012|maintained=y|archived=n|An Act to authorise the issue out of the Consolidated Fund of certain sums for the service of the year ending 31st March 2013; to appropriate those sums for specified purposes; to authorise the Department of Finance and Personnel to borrow on the credit of the appropriated sums; to authorise the use for the public service of certain resources (including accruing resources) for the year ending 31st March 2013; to authorise the use for the public service of excess resources for the year ending 31st March 2011; and to repeal certain spent provisions.}}
|-
| {{|Air Passenger Duty (Setting of Rate) Act (Northern Ireland) 2012|ania|5|11-12-2012|maintained=y|archived=n|An Act to set the rate of air passenger duty for the purposes of section 30A(3) to (5A) of the Finance Act 1994.}}
}}

References

2012